The Palau national baseball team is the national baseball team of Palau. Competes at the South Pacific Games, has won Bronze, Silver and Gold in their last three appearances.

Results
Pacific Games
 1999 : 4th
 2003 :  3rd
 2007 :  1st
 2011 :  3rd

Pacific Mini Games
 2005 :  2nd
 2022 :  3rd

Micronesian Games
 1990 :  1st
 1994 :  3rd
 1998 :  1st
 2002 :  3rd
 2006 :  3rd
 2010 :  1st
 2014 :  3rd
 2018 : 4th
 2023 : TBD

BCO Youth Championship (AAA)
 2004 :  2nd

U-18 BCO Championship
 2019 : 5th

References

National baseball teams
Baseball in Palau
Baseball